Simone Muratore (born 30 May 1998) is an Italian professional footballer who plays as a midfielder for Atalanta.

In December 2019, he made his senior debut with Juventus in the Champions League against Bayer Leverkusen. In June the following year, he made his Serie A debut with the club against Lecce.

Club career

Juventus 
During the 2016–17 and 2017–18 seasons he received a call-up for the Juventus senior side in both the Coppa Italia and the UEFA Champions League respectively, but did not appear on the pitch on either occasion, remaining on the bench.

He made his Serie C debut for Juventus U23 on 16 September 2018 in a 2–1 home defeat against Alessandria.

On 11 December 2019 he made his Champions League debut with Juventus in the team's final group match, a 2–0 away win over Bayer Leverkusen.

On 24 June 2020, it was announced that Muratore had been sold to Atalanta.

On 26 June, he made his Serie A debut, appearing as a second–half substitute in Juventus's 4–0 home win over Lecce.

Atalanta 
On 29 June 2020, Muratore signed for Atalanta for a fee of 7 million euros.

On 31 August 2021, he joined Tondela in Portugal on loan.

International career
On 13 October 2020 he made his debut with the Italy U21 playing as a starter in a qualifying match won 2–0 against Republic of Ireland in Pisa.

Career statistics

Honours

Club 
Juventus U23
 Coppa Italia Serie C: 2019–20

Juventus
 Serie A: 2019–20

References

External links
 

1998 births
People from Cuneo
Footballers from Piedmont
Living people
Italian footballers
Italy youth international footballers
Italy under-21 international footballers
Association football midfielders
A.C.S.D. Saluzzo players
Juventus F.C. players
Juventus Next Gen players
Atalanta B.C. players
A.C. Reggiana 1919 players
C.D. Tondela players
Serie A players
Serie B players
Serie C players
Italian expatriate footballers
Expatriate footballers in Portugal
Italian expatriate sportspeople in Portugal
Sportspeople from the Province of Cuneo